Wellington Phoenix Women's Football Club is a New Zealand professional women's football club based in Wellington, New Zealand. The Phoenix competes in the Australian premier women's soccer competition A-League Women, under licence from Football Federation Australia and New Zealand Football.

History

Establishment
For several years, there have been talks concerning the creation of a professional women's football team in New Zealand so as to boost the level of women's football in New Zealand and Oceania with the cost of traveling to away games a major barrier. There were no professional clubs in New Zealand and the National League only featured amateur teams.
The talks intensified after New Zealand won the rights to co-host the 2023 FIFA Women's World Cup and the W-League plans to add three more expansion teams by that time.

In September 2021, Phoenix announced they were one of the clubs in consideration under the W-League expansion and later confirmed creating a women's team.

Inaugural season
On 11 October 2021, Wellington Phoenix announced Gemma Lewis would be the inaugural head coach of the side. They also announced that Natalie Lawrence would be her assistant for the 2021–22 season, making them one of two all-female coaching staffs in the A-League Women. A few days later, they announced former Perth Glory keeper and 2020–21 players’ player of the year, Lily Alfeld as the clubs inaugural signing. Alfeld was later announced as the club's inaugural captain.

Phoenix played their home games at Wollongong with the hope of returning to their home stadium in Wellington later in the season. Wellington Phoenix started their debut season in the A-League in the 2021–22 season with a 0–0 draw against Western Sydney Wanderers at the Wollongong Showgrounds.

Ava Pritchard scored the club's first goal in their second game of the season, in a 1–5 loss to Newcastle Jets.

On 11 February 2022, the Phoenix achieved their first win in A-League Women history in a 3–0 away win against Canberra United.

Players

First-team squad

Management team

Technical staff

Captaincy history

References

External links

Wellington Phoenix (W-League)
Association football clubs established in 2021
Expatriated football clubs
Sport in Wellington City
2021 establishments in New Zealand
Phoenix clubs (association football)
Wellington Phoenix FC
A-League Women teams
Women's association football clubs in New Zealand